In mathematical physics, the Dirac–von Neumann axioms give a mathematical formulation of quantum mechanics in terms of operators on a Hilbert space. They were introduced by Paul Dirac in 1930 and John von Neumann in 1932.

Hilbert space formulation

The space  is a fixed complex Hilbert space of countably infinite dimension.

 The expectation value of an observable A for a system in a state  is given by the inner product .

Operator algebra formulation
The Dirac–von Neumann axioms can be formulated in terms of a C*-algebra as follows.
 The bounded observables of the quantum mechanical system are defined to be the self-adjoint elements of the C*-algebra.
 The states of the quantum mechanical system are defined to be the states of the C*-algebra (in other words the normalized positive linear functionals ).
 The value  of a state  on an element  is the expectation value of the observable  if the quantum system is in the state .

Example
If  is a unit vector of  then   is a state on the C*-algebra, meaning the unit vectors (up to scalar multiplication) give the states of the system. This is similar to Dirac's formulation of quantum mechanics, though Dirac also allowed unbounded operators, and did not distinguish clearly between self-adjoint and Hermitian operators.

See also
 Axiomatic quantum field theory

References

Operator algebras
Mathematical quantization
Axioms